Pontobelgrandiella is a genus of gastropods belonging to the family Hydrobiidae.

Species:

Pontobelgrandiella angelovi 
Pontobelgrandiella bachkovoensis 
Pontobelgrandiella bulgarica 
Pontobelgrandiella bureschi 
Pontobelgrandiella delevae 
Pontobelgrandiella dobrostanica 
Pontobelgrandiella hessei 
Pontobelgrandiella hubenovi 
Pontobelgrandiella lavrasi 
Pontobelgrandiella lomica 
Pontobelgrandiella maarensis 
Pontobelgrandiella nitida 
Pontobelgrandiella pandurskii 
Pontobelgrandiella petrovi 
Pontobelgrandiella pusilla 
Pontobelgrandiella stanimirae 
Pontobelgrandiella tanevi 
Pontobelgrandiella zagoraensis

References

Hydrobiidae